Eliades Ochoa Bustamante (born 22 June 1946) is a Cuban guitarist and singer from Loma de la Avispa, Songo La Maya in the east of the country near Santiago de Cuba.

He began playing the guitar when he was six and in 1978 he was invited to join Cuarteto Patria, a group founded in 1939, as its leader. Although he looks like a guajiro, and he still wears his trademark cowboy hat, his roots are in the son, and he only agreed to take on the role of leader if he was allowed to introduce new elements to the repertoire. He plays the guitar, tres and also a variant of the guitar, with two additional strings. His involvement with the Buena Vista Social Club and the Wim Wenders film of the same name (1999), has led him to worldwide fame.

In 2010 he recorded an album with a number of Cuban and Malian musicians, including Toumani Diabaté, titled AfroCubism.

Discography

Albums
 Harina de maíz criolla (1980)
 Son de Oriente (1980)
 María Cristina me quiere gobernar (1982)
 Chanchaneando con Compay Segundo (1989)
 La parranda del Teror con el Cuarteto Patria (1992)
 A una coqueta (1993)
 Se soltó un león (1993)
 La trova de Santiago de Cuba. ¡Ay, mamá, qué bueno! (1995)
 Eliades Ochoa y el Cuarteto Patria (1996)
 Buena Vista Social Club (1997)
 CubÁfrica (1996)
 Cuidadito Compay gallo...que llegó el perico (1998)
 Continental Drifter (1999)
 Sublime Ilusión (1999)
 Tributo al Cuarteto Patria (2000)
 Estoy como nunca (2002)
 Las 5 leyendas (2005)
 AfroCubism (2010)
 Un Bolero Para Ti (2011)
 Mi guitarra canta (2011)
 Eliades y la Banda del Jigüe (2011)
 Lo más reciente de Eliades Ochoa (2012)
 El Eliades que Soy (2014)
 Lost and Found (2015)
 Los años no determinan (2016)

Compilations
 Grandes éxitos de Eliades Ochoa (2001)
 Cuarteto Patria 1965-1981 (2004)
 Guajiro Sin Fronteras: Grandes Exitos (2005)
 A la Casa de la Trova (2005)
 The Essential Collection (2005)
 Best of Buena Vista (2006)
 Coleccion Cubana  (2007)

Collaborations
1996	Manu Dibango, CD CubÁfrica
1996	Bévinda, CD Hasta siempre comandante
1998	Cyrius Martínez, CD De Santiago a Baracoa
1999	Charlie Musselwhite, CD Continental Drifter
1999	Hermanas Ferrín, CD Mi linda guajira
1999	Moncho (Ramón Calabuch Batista), CD Quédate conmigo
2000	Luis Eduardo Aute, CD Mira que eres canalla Aute!
2001	Jarabe de palo, CD De vuelta y vuelta
2004	Blof Umoja, CD Umoja
2010	Buena Fe, CD Pi 3,14
2010	William Vivianco, CD El mundo está cambiao
2011	Enrique Bunbury, CD Cantinas
2011	Lia (Ofelia), CD Lia, océano de amor
2013	David Blanco, CD Amigos
2013	Bob Dylan, CD From another world
2014	Pupy y los que son son (César Pedroso), CD Sin límites
2016	María Ochoa, CD Guajira más Guajira

References

External links
 Official website
 Eliades Ochoa discography at AllMusic.com

1946 births
Living people
Cuban guitarists
Cuban male guitarists
Buena Vista Social Club
Cuban people of Basque descent
World Circuit (record label) artists